Paul Juon (Pavel Fyodorovich Yuon) (6 March 1872 – 21 August 1940) was a Russian-born Swiss composer.

Life
Juon was born in Moscow, where his father was an insurance official. His parents were Swiss, and he attended a German primary school in Moscow. In 1889, he entered the Moscow Conservatory, where he studied violin with Jan Hřímalý and composition with Anton Arensky and Sergei Taneyev. He completed his studies at the Hochschule für Musik in Berlin, under Woldemar Bargiel. His first (privately) printed works, two Romanzen (lieder) appeared in 1894, the year he began studies with Bargiel. During his time in Berlin he was a composition professor, employed by Joseph Joachim; his students included Hans Chemin-Petit, Werner Richard Heymann, Nikos Skalkottas, Henry Jolles, Pancho Vladigerov, Philipp Jarnach, Heinrich Kaminski, Lauri Ikonen, Max Trapp, Heino Kaski, Yrjö Kilpinen, Gerhart von Westerman, Hans Moltkau, Giannis Konstantinidis, Wilhelm Guttmann, Stefan Wolpe, Nicolas Nabokov and Gunnar Johansen. He retired to Switzerland in 1934, and died in Vevey.

Music 
Juon's works include sonatas for viola, cello, winds, and three for violin (the third was recorded on a multi-LP set called Musik zwischen den Kriegen : eine Berliner Dokumentation); four symphonies (including one in manuscript) and a chamber symphony; four string quartets; several piano trios, piano quartets and piano quintets, and one sextet for piano and strings; a wind quintet; a number of concertante works, including three violin concertos and a triple concerto with piano trio; many piano works and lieder; and a number of stage works, including an opera, Aleko.

Several of these works have been recorded on compact disc, including some of the sonatas, two of the concertos, two of the symphonies, all four string quartets, the piano trios, and the three violin sonatas (Naxos 8.574091). He is known to have orchestrated Johannes Brahms' Hungarian Dance No. 4.

He also translated Arensky's 'Practical Studies in Harmony' into German.

Personal life 
Juon married his first wife, Katharina Schalchalova, in 1896; they had three children: Ina, Aja, and Ralf. Katharina died in 1911. In 1912, he married Marie Hegner-Günthert (called Armande), with whom he also had three children: Stella, Irsa and Rémi. He dedicated his Mysterien, Op 59 to Armande in 1928.

His younger brother was painter Konstantin Yuon.

Works

 Aleko, opera, 1896 
 Psyche, Op. 32, Tanzpoem, 1906 
 The Golden Temple Book, stage music, 1912 
 The Poor Broom Makers, stage music, 1913 
 Five symphonies (1895-1936)
 Wächterweise in E major, Fantasie nach dänischen Volksl., for orchestra, Op. 31, 1906
 Violin Concerto in B minor, Op. 42, 1909
 Violin Concerto in A major, Op. 49, 1912
 Violin Concerto in A minor, Op. 88, 1931
 Episodes Concertantes for Piano Trio and Orchestra, Op. 45, by 1911 
 Mysterien, a tone poem for Cello and Orchestra based on Knut Hamsun's Mysteries, Op. 59, 1928
 Four string quartets: D major, Op. 5 (1896), B minor, Op. 11 (1896), A minor, Op. 29 (1904), String quartet, Op. 67 (1916)
 Three violin sonatas, Op. 7 in A (1898), Op. 69 in F (1920) and Op. 86 in B minor (1930)

References

External links
Internationale Juon-Gesellschaft

Paul Juon Sound-bites & information on several chamber music works

Dissertation (FSU): Russian Folk Traditions and Cosmopolitan European Influences in the Flute Works of Paul Juon
Dissertation (ProQuest): Russian Folk Traditions and Cosmopolitan European Influences in the Flute Works of Paul Juon

1872 births
1940 deaths
19th-century male musicians
20th-century Russian male musicians
Emigrants from the Russian Empire to Switzerland
Male opera composers
Mendelssohn Prize winners
Moscow Conservatory alumni
Musicians from Moscow
Pupils of Jan Hřímalý
Pupils of Sergei Taneyev
Russian male classical composers
Russian opera composers
Russian people of Swiss descent
Russian Romantic composers
Swiss classical composers
Swiss male classical composers
20th-century Swiss composers